This is the complete list of (physical and digital) number-one albums sold in Finland in 2012 according to the Official Finnish Charts composed by Musiikkituottajat – IFPI Finland.

The best-performing album in 2012 in the Finnish chart was 21 by English Adele, spending nine weeks on the top spot. The second-best chart performer was Finnish Jukka Poika with his album Yhdestä puusta spending six weeks atop. The third-best-performing album was Vain elämää, a compilation of songs by various artists from the similarly titled TV series, spending five weeks atop.

The top-ten list of the best-selling 2012 albums in Finland was the following:

Chart history

See also
List of number-one singles of 2012 (Finland)

References

Number-one albums
Finland Albums
2012